John Walter Smith (February 5, 1845April 19, 1925), was an American politician and a member of the Democratic Party in the United States, held several public offices representing the state of Maryland. From 1899 to 1900, he was a U.S. congressman for the 1st district of Maryland; from 1900 to 1904, he was the 44th Governor of Maryland; and from 1908 to 1921, he served in the U.S. Senate, first as the junior senator for Maryland, and from November 1912 as the senior senator.

Early life and career
Smith was born at Snow Hill, Maryland, and attended private schools and Union Academy.  His mother died when he was five weeks old, and his father died when he was five years old.  Ephraim King Wilson, Smith's cousin, assumed guardianship of Smith, and raised him.  He engaged in the lumber business in Maryland, Virginia, and North Carolina before becoming president of the First National Bank of Snow Hill and director in many business and financial institutions.

Beginning his political career, Smith was elected to the Maryland State Senate in 1889, 1893, and 1897, and served as president of the Senate in 1894.  Following the death of U.S. Senator to Maryland Ephraim K. Wilson in 1891, Smith sought to be elected to replace him, but lost nomination to fellow Democrat Charles H. Gibson.  He was elected to the 56th Congress in 1898 from the 1st Congressional district of Maryland, but served for less than a year before being unexpectedly nominated for Governor of Maryland by the Democratic State Convention in 1899.  Smith was victorious against incumbent governor Lloyd Lowndes, Jr.

Governor of Maryland

As Governor, Smith promoted education, labor, and healthcare reform.  In education, Smith reorganized the public school system, guaranteed free textbooks for all students, appointed a school superintendent, and removed the Agricultural College of Maryland (now known as the University of Maryland, College Park) from private control and placed it under the guidance of the State.  He also improved the State's workmen's compensation program, encouraged a merit system for promotions, reorganized health laws and constructed a State psychiatric hospital.  Governor Smith is also credited with signing into law the Certified Public Accountant Act, making Maryland the third state to create a Profession of Public Accounting with an exam, and state licensing and oversight. Smith also freed the State from much of its debt by the time he departed from the position in 1904.

U.S. Senate

After another unsuccessful attempt at a Senate election in 1904, Smith was elected in January 1908 to succeed William Pinkney Whyte whose term ended in 1909.  When Whyte died in March 1908, Smith was then also elected to finish the term.  He was re-elected in 1914 and served from March 25, 1908, to March 3, 1921.  He lost election in 1920 for a third term as Senator to Ovington E. Weller.

As senator, Smith was chairman of the Committee to Investigate Trespassers Upon Land (62nd Congress), the Committee on the District of Columbia (63rd through 65th Congresses), and the Committee to Examine Branches of the Civil Service (66th Congress).

Smith retired to private life and died in Baltimore, Maryland.  He is buried in the Makemie Memorial Presbyterian Church Cemetery in Snow Hill, MD.

References

John Walter Smith – Delmarva Heritage Series

3. Charlotte C. Smith Obituary- The Sun (Baltimore) March 24, 1845

External links
 

1845 births
1925 deaths
Democratic Party governors of Maryland
Presidents of the Maryland State Senate
Democratic Party Maryland state senators
People from Snow Hill, Maryland
Democratic Party United States senators from Maryland
Democratic Party members of the United States House of Representatives from Maryland